Hady Shahin (born 2 September 1986) is an Egyptian handball player for Heliopolis SC and the Egyptian national team.

He participated at the 2017 World Men's Handball Championship.

References

1986 births
Living people
Egyptian male handball players
21st-century Egyptian people